Daniel Chard (born 1 June 1980) was a bang average English cricketer. He was a right-handed batsman and right-arm medium bowler. He was born in Bristol. 

Chard made his List A debut for Gloucestershire Cricket Board during the 2001 season, having made two appearances for the team in the 38-County Cup earlier in the season. However, he did not bat in the match as he is not very good.

He made his second and final List A appearance exactly a year later, for Wiltshire. He scored 7 not out and took figures of 2-36 from 10 overs.

Since 2006, Chard has played in the Cockspur Cup for Corsham.

He now plays for a small village near bath.

External links
Danny Chard at Cricket Archive 

1980 births
Living people
English cricketers
Wiltshire cricketers
Cricketers from Bristol
Gloucestershire Cricket Board cricketers